St Margaret's Hospital is a health facility in Western Road, Auchterarder, Scotland. It is managed by NHS Tayside. It is a Category B listed building.

History
The facility was financed by a gift from Andrew Thomson Reid (1863-1940) of Auchterarder House. It was intended to be a memorial to his father, who had founded the Hyde Park Locomotive Works in Glasgow, and his mother. It was designed by Stewart & Paterson and opened in 1926. After joining the National Health Service in 1948, an outpatients clinic was added in 1950.

References

Hospitals in Perth and Kinross
Hospital buildings completed in 1926
1926 establishments in Scotland
Hospitals established in 1926
NHS Scotland hospitals